Constantin "Tino" Rossi (29 April 1907 – 26 September 1983) was a French singer and film actor of Corsican origin.

Born in Ajaccio, Corsica, Rossi was gifted with a voice well suited for opera. He became a tenor in the French cabaret style. Later, he appeared in various movies. During his career it is reported he recorded over 2000 songs  and he appeared in more than 25 films, the most notable of which was the 1954 production, Si Versailles m'était conté... directed by Sacha Guitry. His romantic ballads had especially women swooning and his art songs by Jules Massenet (1842–1912), Reynaldo Hahn (1875–1947), and other composers, sold out theaters wherever he performed.

Among his most famous hits, Petit Papa Noel sold over 30 million copies worldwide.  Over the course of his 50-year singing career, Tino Rossi recorded over 2000 songs and sold over 200 million albums making him one of the best selling (and mostly forgotten) artists of all time

Biography

As a young man, Rossi played guitar and sang in many places of his hometown of Ajaccio, but later he went to perform in Marseille and at resort clubs along the French Riviera. In the early 1930s he went to Paris and within a few years achieved enormous success, joining a Columbia Records roster that included the biggest stars of that time such as Lucienne Boyer, Damia, Pills et Tabet, Mireille, and Jean Sablon.

Rossi's success was greatly aided by songwriter Vincent Scotto (1876–1952), who wrote his first hits and collaborated with him for many years, composing and arranging many of Rossi's songs. Prior to World War II, Rossi was a major box office attraction in the French-speaking world, and expanded his audience in 1938 to the U.S. and Canada during a first visit there. Rossi began his film career with a role in Les Nuits Moscovites (1934); his first real success came with Marinella (1936).

During the Occupation of France by Nazi Germany Rossi's film career reached its peak, notably with Fièvres (1942), Le Soleil a toujours raison (1943), Mon amour est près de toi (1943) and L'Île d'amour (1944). Like many celebrities, Tino Rossi was arrested on 7 October 1944 by several police officers in search of information on his close Corsican friend, Etienne Leandri, suspected of active collaborationism. Following three months' detention in the prison of Fresnes, near Paris, during which he stubbornly refused the assistance of a lawyer, he was freed from further detention by a judge, who deemed the charge leveled against him void of substance. Tino Rossi who, in October 1943, had loaned his personal car to a resistance network to transport weapons and enable several escapes (including that of a general), accepted—an extremely rare action at the time—exceptional official apologies.

In 1946 he recorded his song Petit Papa Noël for a movie. The song remained classic for the family and sold several million copies after being released on CD in 1992.

He is the recipient of the prestigious musical award Grand Prix du Disque.

Personal life
In 1948 Tino Rossi married Lilia Vetti, a young dancer he had met in 1941 thanks to revue leader Mistinguett. They had one son called Laurent (1948–2015) and remained married to each other until his death. In 1982 President François Mitterrand named Rossi a Commander of the Legion of Honour for his contributions to French culture. That same year Rossi gave his last public performance at the Casino de Paris, a show that popular demand turned into a three-month stint.

Death
Rossi died of pancreatic cancer in 1983 in Neuilly-sur-Seine, France. His body was transported to Ajaccio for burial in the family grave. His wife died in 2003 aged 79. 

Ajaccio named a street and the sailing harbor in his honor and in Nogent-sur-Marne, there is a square named Tino Rossi Square. A garden on the banks of the Seine in Paris - the Jardin Tino Rossi - was also named in his honour.

Tino Rossi's unique status on Corsica is reflected in several (somewhat hidden) references to him in the comic book "Asterix in Corsica" (1973) by Uderzo and Goscinny.

Filmography

References

External links
"Raquel Bitton - de Piaf a Tino Rossi, frenchmorning.com; accessed 26 August 2015.  
 Rossi profile, fundacionjoseguillermocarrillo.com; accessed 26 August 2015. 
 
 
 Tino Rossi biography, dutempsdescerisesauxfeuillesmortes.net; accessed 26 August 2015.   
 Amazon.com profile; accessed 26 August 2015.

1907 births
1983 deaths
Musicians from Ajaccio
French male film actors
Deaths from pancreatic cancer
Deaths from cancer in France
20th-century French male actors
Pathé-Marconi artists
20th-century French male singers